Rainer Emil Gut (born 24 September 1932, Baar, Switzerland) is a Swiss bank manager and Honorary Chairman of Credit Suisse.

Life 
Rainer E. Gut was born in 1932, the son of bank director Emil and Rosa Gut née Müller. He attended schools in Zug, London and Paris.

In 1968 he became General Partner at Lazard Frères & Co., New York and in 1971 President and CEO of Swiss American Corporation in New York, a U.S. investment banking subsidiary of the then SKA (Schweizerische Kreditanstalt, now Credit Suisse). In 1973 he was a member of the Executive Board and from 1977 he acted as spokesman for "Schweizerische Kreditanstalt" (SKA), of which he became chairman in 1982.

From 1983 to 2000 he was chairman of the Board of Directors of SKA and Credit Suisse respectively, and between 1986 and 2000 also chairman of the Board of Directors of Credit Suisse Group (formerly CS Holding - renamed as of 1 January 1997). From 2000 to 2005, he served as Chairman of Nestlé S.A.. He has held several directorships with international corporations, including Alusuisse, Bayer, Swiss Re, Swissair, Daimler Chrysler Switzerland, Ciba Geigy/Novartis, Elektrowatt, Sulzer. Gut has been Honorary Chairman of Credit Suisse Group since 2000.

Under Gut's leadership, SKA developed into a leading international financial services group (CSG) with a focus on investment banking, asset management and insurance. In the Holocaust debate of the 1990s about dormant assets, he was committed to the creation of a humanitarian fund by the Swiss business community. Thanks in large part to Gut, the settlement between the Swiss banks and the Jewish plaintiffs in New York was reached in 1998.

Gut has been married to Josephine Lorenz since 1957 and has four children (one of them Alexander Gut). Rainer E. Gut lived in Bassersdorf for several decades starting in 1973; today he lives in Maur. His wealth was estimated at CHF 125 million by the business magazine Bilanz in 2019.

Literature 
 Rainer E. Gut Historical Dictionary of Switzerland
 Vorabdruck Rainer E. Gut: Swiss-Geburtshelfer wider Willen Handelszeitung, Zürich 2003, 
 Vorabdruck Rainer E. Gut, Teil 2: Abenteuer First Boston Handelszeitung, Zürich 2003, 
 Vorabdruck Rainer E. Gut, Teil 3: Meister des Networking Handelszeitung, Zürich 2003, 
 Rainer E. Gut die kritische Größe (Memento of 19 October 2007 in the Internet Archive) Neue Zürcher Zeitung (NZZ)

References

External links 
 Publications by and about Rainer E. Gut Swiss National Library
 Rainer E. Gut Honorary Chairman of Credit Suisse Group on the Credit Suisse website
 Interview from the year2007: Die Familie kam immer zuerst (Memento of 29 September 2007 in the Internet Archive) Dorfblitz, 2007
 Mann des Monats: Machtmensch, Weltbürger, Stratege: Rainer E. Gut ist der wichtigste Schweizer Wirtschaftsführer. Handelszeitung, Zürich 2003

Credit Suisse people
Bank presidents and chief executive officers
1932 births
Living people